Henryk Szczęsny (27 March 1909 – 25 July 1996) was a Polish fighter ace of the Polish Air Force in World War II with 9 confirmed kills and one shared.

Biography
Szczęsny was born in Ruszkowo near Ciechanów in Poland. He was the son of Stanisław and Marianna. In January 1931 he entered to Polish Air Force Academy in Dęblin. He was promoted first lieutenant (podporucznik) on 15 August 1933. During the Invasion of Poland he flew old PZL P.7. On 3 September 1939 he was credited with a "probable" victory over a Ju 87. On 14 September, flying a PZL P.11 he shot down a He 111. He injured his leg in the next day.

On 17 September, he crossed the border with Romania, in Bucharest he healed his wound. On 12 November 1939 he arrived in Marseille. He came to England in February 1940. On 6 August he was assigned to a fighter squadron. One week later he shot down a Do 17. On 19 December he was posted to No. 317 Polish Fighter Squadron. Between 20 August 1941 and 28 February 1942 he was made Commanding Officer of his squadron.

On 4 April 1943 his plane was damaged in combat with two enemy planes, he had to parachute and was captured by the Germans. He was sent to Stalag Luft III. After his release from internment in 1945 he returned to England. He served in the RAF until 1965.

Henryk Szczęsny died on 25 July 1996 in London. He was buried at the Gunnersbury Cemetery.

His son, Bradley Curtis (born Zdzisław Szczêsny; July 9, 1938 – August 19, 1980), was the flight engineer of Saudia Flight 163 that claimed the lives of 301 people including Curtis.

Aerial victory credits
 Ju 87 – 3 September 1939 probably destroyed and 1 damaged
 He 111 – 14 September 1939
 He 111 – 15 September 1939
 Do 17 – 13 August 1940
 Bf 110 – 11 September 1940
 1/3 x Do 215 – 5 October 1940
 Bf 109 – 1 December 1940
 Bf 109 - 2 December 1940 damaged
 Bf 109 – 5 December 1940
 1/2 x Bf 109 – 10 July 1941
 1/2 x Ju 88 – 14 July 1941
 2 x Fw 190 – 4 April 1943

Awards
 Virtuti Militari, Silver Cross 
 Cross of Valour (Poland), four times
 Distinguished Flying Medal

References

Further reading
 Tadeusz Jerzy Krzystek, Anna Krzystek: Polskie Siły Powietrzne w Wielkiej Brytanii w latach 1940-1947 łącznie z Pomocniczą Lotniczą Służbą Kobiet (PLSK-WAAF). Sandomierz: Stratus, 2012, p. 553. 
 Jerzy Pawlak: Absolwenci Szkoły Orląt: 1925-1939. Warszawa: Retro-Art, 2009, p. 130. 
 Piotr Sikora: Asy polskiego lotnictwa. Warszawa: Oficyna Wydawnicza Alma-Press. 2014, p. 207–212. 
 Józef Zieliński: Asy polskiego lotnictwa. Warszawa: Agencja lotnicza ALTAIR, 1994, p. 24. ISBN 83862172. 
 Józef Zieliński: Lotnicy polscy w Bitwie o Wielką Brytanię. Warszawa: Oficyna Wydawnicza MH, 2005, p. 199–200. 
 ASC par. Gołymin nr aktu ur. 31/1909 Ruszkowo, E. Lewandowski, Liceum Ogólnokształcące im. Zygmunta Krasińskiego w Ciechanowie, Ciechanów 2005
 

The Few
Recipients of the Distinguished Flying Medal
Polish World War II flying aces
Royal Air Force officers
Recipients of the Silver Cross of the Virtuti Militari
Recipients of the Cross of Valour (Poland)
1996 deaths
1909 births
People from Ciechanów County
Polish prisoners of war in World War II